Nowdezh Rural District is a rural district (dehestan) in Aseminun District, Manujan County, Kerman Province, Iran. At the 2006 census, its population was 3,030, in 653 families. The rural district has 9 villages.

References 

Rural Districts of Kerman Province
Manujan County